This article shows the rosters of all participating teams at the men's water polo tournament at the 2015 Pan American Games in Toronto. Rosters can have a maximum of 13 athletes.

The following is the Argentinian men's water polo squad.

Tomas Bulgheroni
Carlos Camnsaio
Ivan Carabantes
Esteban Corsi
Julian Daszczyk
Franco Demarchi
Emanuel Lopez
Diego Malnero
Hernan Mazzini
Andres Monutii
Juan Montane Tobares
Ramiro Veich
German Yanez

Brazil announced their squad on April 16, 2015.

Adrián Delgado
Bernardo Gomes
Bernardo Rocha
Felipe Perrone
Felipe Costa e Silva
Guilherme Gomes
Gustavo Guimarães
Ives Alonso
Jonas Crivella
Josip Vrlić
Paulo Salemi
Thyê Bezerra
Vinicius Antonelli

Canada announced their squad on June 23, 2015.

Dusan Aleksic
Justin Boyd
Nicolas Constantin-Bicari
John Conway
Kevin Graham
Constantine Kudaba
Jared McElroy
Dusan Radojcic
Robin Randall
Scott Robinson
Alec Taschereau
George Torakis
Oliver Vikalo

Cuba's team roster:

Gianny Lara
Rudy Despaigne
Ernesto Cisneros
Edgar Lara
Ivey Arroyo
Giraldo Carales
Albert Guerra
Remy De Armas
Jose Peralta
Raydel Carales
Yohandry Andrade
Raydel Martinez

The following is the Ecuadorian men's water polo squad.

Garret Kaltenbach
Kevin Mindiola Reyes
Edwin  Carrera Mantilla
Jose Pazmiño Yepez
Troy Kaltenbach
Andres Benitez Pazmiño
Jeffrey Wheeler
Carlos Heredia Viteri
David Valle Villamarin
Chandler Kaltenbach
Gabriel Moran Plua
Astolfo Rodriguez Loaiza
Jean  Castro Gonzalez

Mexico's team roster:

Orlando Ortega
Diego Marcado
Jose Avalos
Edgar O'Brien Jr
Manuel Paniagua
Pablo Carballo
Oliver Alvarez
Jose Serrano
Armando Garcia
Perseo Ponce
Ever Resendiz
Rodolfo Cervantes
Alfredo De La Mora

The following is the United States men's water polo squad.

Merrill Moses
Nikola Vavic
Alex Obert
Jackson Kimbell
Alex Roelse
Luca Cupido
Josh Samuels
Tony Azevedo
Alex Bowen
Bret Bonanni
Jesse Smith
John Mann
McQuin Baron

Venezuela's team roster:

Carlos Linares Suarez
Joaquin Lopez
Jean Sanchez Rangel
Douglas Espinoza Castro
Pedro Mujica Cardenas
Carlos Fernandez Ramos
Angel Rojas Borge
Hugo Velazquez Briceño
Antonio Pirela Ortiz
Jonder Perdomo Duarte
Moises Perez Ribas
Pedro Gutierrez Benedetto
Adrian Torres Granda

References

Men
2015